Masoom Sawaal is a 2022 Indian Hindi-language film directed by Santosh Upadhyay. It stars Nitanshi Goel, Ekavali Khanna, Shishir Sharma, Madhu Sachdeva and Rohit Tiwari. The film is produced by Ranjana Upadhyay, Nakshatra 27 Productions. The film was released on 5 August 2022.

Cast 

 Nitanshi Goel 
 Ekavali Khanna
 Shishir Sharma
 Madhu Sachdeva
 Rohit Tiwari
 Brinda Trivedi

Plot 
The story of the film revolves around the superstitions and regulations imposed on women during their menstrual cycle.

References

External links 

 
2022 films
Indian drama films
2020s Hindi-language films